Harikathe Alla Girikathe is a 2022 Indian Kannada-language comedy-drama film written by Giri Krishna and directed by Karan Ananth and Anirudh Mahesh. It stars Rishab Shetty alongside Thapaswini Poonacha, Honnavalli Krishna, Rachana Inder, and Anirudh Mahesh. The music was composed by Vasuki Vaibhav.

Plot 
Three people come together to pursue a common goal of making it big in the movie business.

Cast
 Rishab Shetty as Giri Honnavalli Krishna and himself
 Thapaswini Poonacha as Kushi Jokumaraswami, MLA's Daughter
 Rachana Inder as Girija Thomas
 Honnavalli Krishna as Giri's father/himself
 Pramod Shetty as Inspector Abhimanyu 
 Anirudh Mahesh as 5D Thomas
 Rakshith Ramachandra Shetty as Villain Giri
 Deepak Rai Panaaje as Prasanna, Giri's friend
 Kiran Chandrashekhar Shetty as Super Super
 Raghu Pandeshwar as Mobile Raghu
 P D Sathish Chandra as Bank Manager
 Dinesh Mangalore as Jokumaraswamy
 Salman Ahmed as Salman 
 Shashank M C as Usman
 Shine Shetty as Talkative lover (Cameo)
 Sandesh Nagaraj as himself (Cameo)
 Kiranraj K. as himself (Cameo)
 Chandrajith Belliyappa as himself (Cameo)
 Yogaraj Bhat as himself (Cameo)

Release
The film was released on 23 June 2022.

References

External links
 

2022 films
2020s Kannada-language films